The Serra do Rola-Moça State Park is a state park in the state of Minas Gerais, Brazil.
It protects a rugged area in the transition zone between cerrado and Atlantic Forest. Springs in the park are important to the water supply of the state capital, Belo Horizonte.

Location

The Serra do Rola-Moça State Park is in the metropolitan region of Belo Horizonte, divided between the municipalities of Belo Horizonte, Nova Lima, Ibirité and Brumadinho. 
It contains six important springs that supply water to the city, and this area is closed to the public.

History

The Serra do Rola-Moça State Park was created by governor Hélio Garcia by decree 36.071 of 27 September 1994.
The Taboão, Rola-Moça, Barreirinho, Barreiro, Mutuca and Catarina water basins in the park protect the water sources used by the Minas Gerais Sanitation Company (COPASA/MG).
Activities such as leisure and tourism that may interfere with biota in these areas were therefore prohibited, and the areas were administered by COPASA/MG.
The State Forestry Institute (IEF) was made responsible for overall administration of the park and for developing plans for administration and environmental education.
The consultative council included representatives of government and civil society organizations.

Environment

The park is in the transition zone between cerrado and Atlantic Forest.
It contains areas of Atlantic Forest, cerrado, Alpine tundra and rupestrian ferruginous fields.
The ferruginous field vegetation, growing on the iron-bearing "canga" crust, is extremely rare and is found only in the iron quadrilateral of Minas Gerais and in the Carajás Mountains in the state of Pará. Visits to these fields are allowed only when accompanied by park monitors.

The park has diverse flora with species of the Orchidaceae, Bromeliaceae families and jacaranda, arnica and cedrus genera. 
Species include Cariniana legalis, Gochnatia polymorpha and Vellozia squamata.
The park provides a refuge for endangered fauna such as the cougar (Puma concolor), ocelot (Leopardus pardalis), oncilla (Leopardus tigrinus), maned wolf (Chrysocyon brachyurus), Pampas deer (Ozotoceros bezoarticus) and solitary tinamou (Tinamus solitarius).

Visiting

The park is open from 8:00 am to 5:00 pm daily. Camping is not allowed.
Access to trails, springs, waterfalls and nurseries requires advance scheduling. 
At the Nova Lima entrance there is a visitor center with an auditorium for 90 people, meeting rooms and rooms for the environmental police.
At the Barreiro entrance in Belo Horizonte there is an auditorium for 60 people, offices, employee residences and the base of the environmental police.
The park has hiking trails and lookouts.
The Três Pedras, Planeta, Jatobá and Morro dos Veados lookouts provide panoramic views.
The best time to visit is between April and October, when there is less rain.

Notes

Sources

State parks of Brazil
Protected areas established in 1994
1994 establishments in Brazil
Protected areas of Minas Gerais